Mukaghali Makatayev (Mūqağali Maqataev; February 9, 1931 – March 27, 1976) was a Kazakh poet, writer and translator. Muqagali Maqataev is put on a par with such pillars of Kazakh literature as Abai and Mukhtar Auezov. Fame and recognition came to him after his death. Maqataev lived a short but bright life, leaving to his descendants an extraordinary poetry full of national color.

Early life
Muqagali Suleimenovich Maqataev was born on February 9, 1931, in the village of Karasaz, Narynkol district, Almaty region, Kazakh SSR, at the foot of Khan Tengri. At first, the parents named him Mukhametkali, but then the mother considered that the name of the prophet carries a great responsibility and began to call the child Mukagali. The boy's father Suleimen worked on the land. In 1940, he became the chairman of the collective farm, but the war interrupted peaceful life. Suleimen went to the front and died in battle. Mother Nagiman doted on her first child. When his father went to the front, the 10-year-old boy remained the main man in the family.

Education and Career
He graduated from school and began his career as a secretary of the village council, the head of the red yurt, an employee of the Komsomol organs, and a literary employee of the regional newspaper.

In 1952–1969 he worked in a high school as a teacher of Russian language, a speaker on the Kazakh Radio, an executive secretary of The Soviet border newspaper, a literary contributor to the newspapers Socialist Kazakhstan (Sotsıalıstik Qazaqtan) and Culture and Life (Mádenıet jáne Turmys) and Star (Juldyz) magazine. In 1970 he joined the Writers' Union of Kazakhstan. In 1973–1974 he studied in the Moscow Institute of Arts and Letters.

Mukaghali Makatayev's poetic works were first published in 1948. He became famous with his poem «Appassionata» (1962). The poems "Lenin" (Lenın; 1964) and "The Moor" (Mavr; 1970) were devoted to Lenin and Marx. Poetry collections Hello Friends (Armysyńdar dostar 1966), You came, my Swallow? (Qarlyǵashym keldiń be?; 1968), Alas, my heart (Darıǵa jurek; 1972), When swans asleep (Aqqýlar uıyqtaǵanda 1974), The warmth of life (Shýaǵym meniń; 1975), Poem of Life (Ómir-dastan; 1976), River of Life (Ómir-ózen; 1978), Heart sings (Jyrlaıdy júrek; 1-2 Books, 1982), Sholpan (Sholpan; 1984) and others entered the golden fund of the Kazakh national poetry. Prose works were included in the collection titled Two Swallows (Qos qarlyǵash; 1988). Many of Makatayev's poems were turned into songs.

Makatayev translated into the Kazakh language sonnets of William Shakespeare (1970), poems of Walt Whitman (1969), Dante's Divine Comedy (1971), and other literary works.

Death
Mukaghali Makatayev died in Almaty on March 27, 1976, at the age of 45. In 1999 Mukaghali Makatayev was posthumously awarded the State Prize of the Republic of Kazakhstan for the collection of poems under the title «Amanat».

References 

Kazakhstani poets
Soviet poets
Male poets
Soviet male writers
20th-century male writers
1931 births
1976 deaths